Sherry Rich & The Grievous Angels is Sherry Rich's debut EP, released in 1995. It is the first recording from Rich, since the break-up of her former outfit Girl Monstar in 1993.

Background

After signing with Melbourne-based independent label Rubber Records in 1994, Sherry Rich recorded the tracks for her first EP during July 1994 at Atlantis Studios.

Track listing
 Get Your Kicks  
 Wild Dogs 
 When Love Calls
 Beautiful, Talented and Dead  
 You Can Have That Man

Release history

This EP was released at the time Country Music in Australia was experiencing a surge in popularity. 'New Country' was a term coined to describe this movement, with Rich at the forefront of it. Respected Australian musician Charlie Owen performs Dobro and Lap Steel on this EP. Other guest musicians include Jen Anderson, Rusty Berther, Bruce Haymes and Michael Barclay. The EP was produced by Steve Connolly, who was a member of Paul Kelly's band. Rich's tune 'Beautiful, Talented and Dead' was written about the 1994 suicide of Kurt Cobain. This track would later be re-recorded and included on Rich's debut album. The image on the CD is a photograph of Rich's mother Noeline (who also had a career in Australian country music)- performing live in 1961.

Personnel

Grievous Angels
 Sherry Rich - lead vocals, guitar
 Steve Connolly - lead guitar, acoustic guitar, background vocals
 Doug Lee Robertson - bass and backing vocals
 Steve Morrison - drums

Guest Musicians
 Matt Heydon - keyboards
 Garrett Costigan - pedal steel
 Charlie Owen - dobro, lap steel
 Jen Anderson - fiddle
 Rusty Berther - banjo
 Bruce Haymes - piano, hammond organ
 Michael Barclay - background vocals

Production
 Steve Connolly - producer
 David McCluney - engineer
 Maikka Trupp - photography

References

1994 EPs
Sherry Rich albums